Hakusui Dam is a gravity concrete and fill dam (compound dam) located in Gifu Prefecture in Japan. The dam is used for power production. The catchment area of the dam is 11.5 km2. The dam impounds about 1  ha of land when full and can store 29290 thousand cubic meters of water. The construction of the dam was completed in 1963.

References

Dams in Gifu Prefecture
1963 establishments in Japan